The Parallactic Islands refers to a group of 6 small islands between the Azimuth and Kellas Islands in Holme Bay, Mac. Robertson Land. Mapped by Norwegian cartographers from air photos taken by the Lars Christensen Expedition, 1936–37. Named by Antarctic Names Committee of Australia (ANCA) after Parallactic Island, one of the group.

See also 
 List of Antarctic and sub-Antarctic islands

Islands of Mac. Robertson Land